Shirley Baker (9 July 1932 – 21 September 2014) was a British photographer, best known for her street photography and street portraits in working class areas of Greater Manchester. She worked as a freelance writer and photographer on various magazines, books and newspapers, and as a lecturer on photography. Most of her photography was made for her personal interest but she undertook occasional commissions.

During her lifetime Baker's photographs were published in two books and exhibited at The Photographers' Gallery, The Lowry and Salford Museum and Art Gallery.

Life and work
They moved to Manchester when she was two, and her sister later boarded at Penrhos Girls' School in Colwyn Bay, North Wales, from where they were evacuated during the Second World War to Chatsworth House, in Derbyshire. Baker went on to study photography at Manchester College of Technology, and took other courses at Regent Street Polytechnic in London and the London College of Printing. Later in life she gained an MA in critical history and the theory of photography at the University of Derby in 1995.

Baker started working as an industrial photographer for fabric manufacturers Courtaulds before working as freelance, as a photographer for other businesses and as a writer and photographer on various magazines, books and newspapers, including The Guardian.

In 1960 she began work as a lecturer at the Salford College of Art. Whilst there, for the next fifteen years, she made candid, unposed, spontaneous photographs of people living in the area in Salford and Manchester during a time of massive slum clearance. She has said she was influenced by the work of Henri Cartier-Bresson, Robert Frank and Garry Winogrand. She also worked as a lecturer at Manchester Polytechnic. She also joined the Royal Photographic Society in 1960 remaining a member for several years.

Baker had two books of her photographs published during her lifetime. Street Photographs: Manchester and Salford (1989) contains her photographs of people in Salford and Manchester in the 1960s and early 1970s. In the late 1990s she was commissioned by The Lowry to revisit the same places. The Lowry held an exhibition of her work and published a book, Streets and Spaces: Urban Photography – Salford and Manchester – 1960s–2000 (2000), with her older photographs juxtaposed against her new photographs, showing people in different periods, in a radically altered urban landscape, yet involved in similar activities.

In the 1980s, when Baker's doctor husband's work took them to London for a time, she photographed punks in and around Camden Lock and Camden Market. She also photographed in Japan, New York and the French Riviera. In 1987 she undertook a project on the Royal Manchester Children's Hospital supported by Viewpoint Gallery, Salford. In July and August 1987 she completed a commission to photograph at Manchester Airport for the Documentary Photography Archive (DPA). Baker's work at the airport was featured in a Granada Television programme on the work of the DPA and broadcast as part of its "Celebration" series on 23 October 1987.

Publications
Street Photographs: Manchester and Salford.  Newcastle upon Tyne: Bloodaxe, 1989. . With essays by Stephen Constantine, "Street Scenes: Late Afternoon", and by Baker, "Street Photographs".
Streets and Spaces: Urban Photography – Salford and Manchester – 1960s–2000. Salford: The Lowry, 2000. . Edited by Michael Leitch and with an essay by Baker. Published to accompany an exhibition at The Lowry.
Women and Children; and Loitering Men. London: The Photographers' Gallery, 2015. . Published to accompany the exhibition Women, Children and Loitering Men at The Photographers' Gallery, London, 17 July – 20 September 2015. Edited by Anna Douglas. With a preface by Brett Rogers, a foreword by Grislelda Pollock, an essay by Anna Douglas and a short story by Jackie Kay.
Shirley Baker. London: Mack, 2019. Edited by Lou Stoppard. .

Zines
Punks 1980s. Southport: Café Royal, 2018; 2020.
British Seaside 1960–1970. Southport: Café Royal, 2018; 2020.
Manchester and Salford Children in the 1960s. Southport: Café Royal, 2018.
Manchester and Salford on Holiday in the 1960s. Southport: Café Royal, 2018.

Exhibitions

Solo exhibitions
1986: My Face or Yours, touring exhibition.
2000/2001: Salford Revisited, The Lowry, Salford, Greater Manchester, 26 August 2000 – 1 January 2001.
2006/2007: The Photographers' Gallery, London, 18 February 2006 – 31 December 2007.
2011/2012: Salford Museum and Art Gallery, Salford, Greater Manchester, 19 November 2011 – 4 March 2012. A retrospective.
2013: Looking Outwards, Gallery Oldham, Oldham.
2015: Women, Children and Loitering Men, The Photographers' Gallery, London, 17 July – 20 September 2015.

Exhibitions with others
1963: Nine Photographers, Manchester Building and Design Centre, Manchester, 18 November – 6 December 1963. With Dennis Btesh, Ray Green, Alfred Gregory, Neil Libbert, Ralph Marshall and Sefton Samuels.
1986: Here Yesterday, and Gone Today exhibited at Salford Art Gallery as part of the Images of Salford exhibition.
1989: North West Frontiers, 8 July 1989 – 27 August 1989, Cornerhouse, Manchester. Work by Baker as well as David Hatfield, David Sweet, Don McKinlay, Fiona Moate, Jaghit Chuhan, John Brisland, John Lyons, John Roberts, Mark Warner, Melvyn Chantry, Moses Lee, Nenagh Watson, Patrick Lumb, Rachael Field, Roger Birch, Sarah Feinmann, Alnoor Mitha, Bill Sharp, Clare Pickles, Adrian Moakes, Mark Bradley, Andrew Robarts and David Alker.
2012: A Lowry Summer, The Lowry, Salford, Greater Manchester, 7 July – 28 October 2012. Exhibition of work by L. S. Lowry accompanied by work from other artists who depicted leisure time, Baker and Humphrey Spender.
2012: Observers: British Photography and the British Scene, Serviço Social da Indústria (SESI), São Paulo. With photographs by Baker and Cecil Beaton, Bill Brandt, Humphrey Spender, George Rodger, Paul Nash, Madame Yevonde, Nigel Henderson, Roger Mayne, Ida Kar, Norman Parkinson, Terence Donovan, Ian Berry, Tony Ray-Jones, Raymond Moore, Paul Trevor, Tish Murtha, Daniel Meadows, Chris Killip, Martin Parr, Paul Graham, Keith Arnatt, Anna Fox, Derek Ridgers, Peter Fraser, Jem Southam, Karen Knorr, Richard Billingham, Paul Seawright, Simon Roberts, Wolfgang Tillmans, Jason Evans, Nigel Shafran, Rut Blees Luxemburg, Sarah Jones, John Duncan and Gareth McConnell.

References

External links
'Laughter in the slums: the best work of street photographer Shirley Baker – in pictures'

1932 births
2014 deaths
Photographers from Lancashire
Street photographers
English women photographers
Alumni of the Regent Street Polytechnic
Alumni of the University of Derby
People from Salford
Alumni of the London College of Printing